Jam Ikramullah Khan Dharejo is a Pakistani politician who has been a Member of the Provincial Assembly of Sindh since February 2008 and current Provincial Minister for Industries and Commerce, Anti-corruption Establishment and Co-operatives, Government of Sindh.

Early life and family
He was born on 17 April 1973 in Adilpur, Ghotki district .

He is the brother of former Provincial Minister of Sindh, Jam Saifullah Khan Dharejo

Political career

He was elected to the Provincial Assembly of Sindh as a candidate of Pakistan Peoples Party (PPP) from Constituency PS-6 (Sukkur-II) in 2008 Pakistani general election. He received 29,633 votes and defeated Ali Nawaz Khan Mehar.

He was re-elected to the Provincial Assembly of Sindh as a candidate of PPP from Constituency PS-3 (Sukkur-II) in 2013 Pakistani general election.
 He received 26,348 votes and defeated Ali Gohar Indhar, a candidate of Jamiat Ulema-e Islam (F) (JUI-F).

In August 2016, he was into provincial Sindh cabinet of Chief Minister Syed Murad Ali Shah and was appointed as Provincial Minister of Sindh for co-operatives.

He was re-elected to Provincial Assembly of Sindh as a candidate of PPP from Constituency PS-22 (Sukkur-I) in  2018 Pakistan General Electionsagainst Ali Gohar Khan Mahar a candidate for Grand Democratic Aliance (GDA).

In 2019 August he was re-inducted to the Sindh cabinet of Chief Minister Syed Murad Ali Shah as minister of Co-operatives and an additional portfolio of Industries and Commerce.

In a cabinet shuffle in February 2020, he was given the additional portfolio of Inquiries and Anti-corruption establishment . He was also appointed as PPP Deputy General Secretary Sindh by party leadership .

References

Living people
Sindh MPAs 2013–2018
1973 births
Pakistan People's Party MPAs (Sindh)
Sindh MPAs 2018–2023
Sindh MPAs 2008–2013